Lapshin (from лапша meaning noodles) is a Russian masculine surname, its feminine counterpart is Lapshina. It may refer to

 Igor Lapshin (born 1963), Russian triple jumper
 Konstantin Lapshin, London-based Russian pianist
 Mikhail Lapshin (1934–2006), Russian former President of the Altai Republic
 Pavlo Lapshyn, Ukrainian terrorist
Sergei Lapshin (born 1974), Russian football coach and a former player
 Timofey Lapshin (born 1988), South Korean biathlete.

See also
My Friend Ivan Lapshin, a 1984 Soviet criminal drama film

Russian-language surnames